Polymerus unifasciatus is a species of plant bug in the family Miridae. It is found in Europe and Northern Asia (excluding China), North America, and Southern Asia.

References

Further reading

External links

 

Insects described in 1794
Polymerus